Retrognathia is a type of malocclusion which refers to an abnormal posterior positioning of the maxilla or mandible, particularly the mandible, relative to the facial skeleton and soft tissues.

A retrognathic mandible is commonly referred to as an overbite, though this terminology is not used medically.

See also
 Micrognathism
 Prognathism

References

External links 

 Diagram at brooksideorthodontics.com - see Classification of Face:Class 2 section

Jaw disorders